DC USA is an  vertical power center, i.e. a multilevel enclosed urban shopping center anchored by big box stores. It is located in the Columbia Heights neighborhood of Washington, D.C.  A Washington City Paper poll named DC USA the "Best Designed Retail Space" of 2009. The development is adjacent to the Columbia Heights station on the Yellow and Green Lines of the Washington Metro. It is also served by ten bus routes and has a 1,000-space parking garage.

The complex is accessible to more than 36,000 residents within a 10-minute walk of the site. A total of 335,000 residents live within a  radius. The development has been designed to fit into its urban setting, with the buildings holding the street line to frame the sidewalks and continue the urban scale.

Target, one of the anchors, has expanded its urban store concept to numerous cities across the country. In 2013 it opened a store in a redeveloped historic office building in the heart of Portland, Oregon.

Anchors
Anchors include:
 Bed Bath & Beyond
 Best Buy
 DSW
 Marshalls
 Five Below
 Lidl (opening in 2023)
 Old Navy
 Petco
 Snipes (opening in 2023)
 Target
 Washington Sports Clubs

Other tenants include IHOP, Krispy Kreme, and Taco Bell Cantina.

Site history
DC USA sits on the site of the old Romanesque Revival style electric streetcar garage of the Capitol Traction Company built in 1892, located at what was then the terminus of a streetcar line. After the line was extended north the building was no longer needed as a car barn and in 1910, investors repurposed it as an entertainment complex, The Arcade. It contained ground floor retail space, an auditorium, dance hall, cinema, small Dutch restaurant, pool,  bowling alley, and food market with over 100 vendor stalls. After commercial decline and debt, Kress purchased the building in 1947 and tore it down, eventually building a two-story commercial building that would house a Safeway supermarket and People's Drug store.

References

Columbia Heights, Washington, D.C.
Shopping malls in Washington, D.C.
Shopping malls established in 2008
2008 establishments in Washington, D.C.